Rebul Academy is a private K-12 school in Learned, Mississippi, in Hinds County.

History

Rebul was founded in 1967 as a segregation academy. In 1970, the school lost its tax exempt status as the result of a determination by the IRS that it had discriminatory admission practices. It did not get tax-exempt status until 1993.

Athletics
Rebul plays football in the MAIS league.

References

 Bussey, Charles. Where We Stand: Voices Of Southern Dissent. NewSouth Books, 2004. , 9781588381699.

Private middle schools in Mississippi
Schools in Hinds County, Mississippi
Private elementary schools in Mississippi
Private high schools in Mississippi
Segregation academies in Mississippi